Dacgleia is a genus of moths belonging to the subfamily Olethreutinae of the family Tortricidae. It contains only one species, Dacgleia cerata, which is found in Vietnam.

The wingspan is 17 mm. The ground colour of the forewings is yellow-brown in the costal third and pale brownish grey in the dorsal area. There are some black dots forming two incomplete transverse rows in the posterior third of the wing and a few scattered in the median area of the wing. The hindwings are cream brown.

Etymology
The name of the genus refers to Dac Glei, the type locality of the type species. The specific name refers to the shape of uncus and socii and is derived from Latin ceratus (meaning with horns).

See also
List of Tortricidae genera

References

Enarmoniini
Monotypic moth genera
Taxa named by Józef Razowski